Kelly-Anne Smith (born 9 July 1979 in Winchester, Hampshire) is a voice-over artist and presenter based in London.
Smith is a continuity announcer for Channel 5 in the UK. She started as a radio presenter and was the Drivetime DJ on national station Virgin Radio.

Education 
Smith has a BA Communication, Culture and Media from Coventry University. Whilst at university she created the student radio station Phoenix Radio   now known as Source Radio.

Early career 
Smith started with a work placement at local Coventry radio station Kix96 whilst at university and was also a broadcast assistant for BBC CWR. In June 2001 she began hosting the breakfast show at Loughborough station Oak FM. From there she moved to the East Midlands regional station Century 106. She presented the new music evening show, interviewing new bands and doing live sessions.

Virgin Radio 
Smith joined Virgin Radio in 2003 to present a brand new evening show "Most Wanted". Being sandwiched in between Daryl Denham and Jeremy Kyle. After five months of being on the station, she was promoted to the drivetime slot Kelly-Anne did a lot of the interviews for the station and at the Isle of Wight Festival and V festival including Roger Daltrey, Pink and Hollywood superstar Will Smith. She has since returned to cover at the station as Virgin Radio and more recently as Absolute Radio.

Radio voice-over  
Smith's radio branding voice work includes Global Radio's Capital network, in London and across the UK and Bauer Radio Big City Network. She was the imaging voice for the Virgin Radio Canada network, which won an RAP Gold award for imaging. She voices the Free Radio Network in the UK, and is on stations in Pakistan, Canada, Switzerland and France as well as across America as the voice of Akon's Hitlab Radio Show and the Remix Top 30 Countdown with Sean Hamilton.

Continuity 
Smith started as a continuity announcer for Five Life (now 5Star). She went to Sky One as a live announcer briefly but then moved to Channel 5 as a live continuity announcer on their public broadcasting channel. She is always the announcer around CSI and once interviewed the elusive William Petersen for a CSI special. She is also a continuity announcer for BBC Entertainment, Sky Atlantic, TLC (TV channel) and Sony Entertainment Television (UK & Ireland).

On-screen 
Smith presents on the Game of Thrones Thronecast for Sky Atlantic  where she interviews the cast. Kelly-Anne presented coverage of the Eurovision Song Contest 2013 for MSN International

References

External links 

 
 

English voice actresses
English radio personalities
Living people
1979 births
Alumni of Coventry University
Mass media people from Winchester